Årjängstravet is a horse racing track for harness racing, located in Årjäng, Värmland County, Sweden. Årjängstravet is known as "the most beautiful harness racing course in Sweden". Årjängstravet arranges about 20 horse racing events in a year.

History 
The course was built in 1936. Eight men transformed a mire to a fully usable kilometer harness racing course using shovels, wheelbarrows and 3-5 North Swedish horses; they completed the building of the track in ten weeks. The men behind the work were: Ossian Jonasson, Gunnar Jonasson, Reidar Jonasson, Cato Kristiansson, Ragnar Alfredsson, Sven Alfredsson, Tyko Kylén and Georg Nilsson. The premier use of the racetrack was on 30 September, in the same year.

Major events 
Årjäng Big Sprinter Race.

References 

Harness racing venues in Sweden
Buildings and structures in Värmland County
1936 establishments in Sweden
Sports venues completed in 1936